New Pittsburg may refer to:

New Pittsburg, Indiana
New Pittsburg, Ohio